The Printers Devil was a historic pub in Bristol, England.

It was built in the late 18th century as a pub, and used to be known as the Queen's Head.

It is a grade II listed building.

Since July 2008, the pub has been closed.

References

Commercial buildings completed in 1858
Grade II listed pubs in Bristol
Pubs in Gloucestershire